"Just My Imagination" is a song by Irish band the Cranberries. It was released as the third single from the band's fourth album, Bury the Hatchet, in August 1999. A music video, directed by Phil Harder, was released to promote the single. In 2017, the song was released as a stripped-down acoustic version on the band's Something Else album.

Track listings
2-track CD single
 "Just My Imagination" – 3:41
 "God Be with You" – 3:32
"God Be with You" was written by Dolores O'Riordan and produced by O'Riordan and Bruce Fairbairn in 1997. Other members of the band do not appear on that track. The song was originally released for "The Devil's Own" movie soundtrack.

UK CD single 1
 "Just My Imagination" – 3:41
 "God Be with You" – 3:32
 "Zombie" (Live Hamburg '99) – 6:13
This CD1 release was cancelled just before release.

UK CD single 2
 "Just My Imagination" – 3:41
 "Such a Shame" – 4:22
 "Promises" (Live Hamburg '99) – 5:32
This CD2 release was also cancelled just before release. Some copies made it onto the market and are considered quite rare since this release contains the live version os "Promises" from Hamburg '99 which wasn't released on the EU- 4-track single.

European maxi single
 "Just My Imagination" – 3:41
 "God Be with You" – 3:32
 "Such a Shame" – 4:22
 "Zombie" (live Hamburg '99) – 6:13

Special limited-edition Italian tour CD single
 "Just My Imagination" – 3:41
 "Dreams" (live at Radio 105 Network, Palalido, Milano, Italia) – 4:35
 "Ode to My Family" (live at Radio 105 Network, Palalido, Milano, Italia) – 4:34
 "Animal Instinct" (live at Radio 105 Network, Palalido, Milano, Italia) – 3:42

Charts

References

1999 singles
1999 songs
The Cranberries songs
Island Records singles
Music videos directed by Phil Harder
Songs written by Dolores O'Riordan
Songs written by Noel Hogan